And God Said to Cain is a 1970 Spaghetti Western film directed by Antonio Margheriti and starring Klaus Kinski.

The story is about Gary Hamilton, who is granted a free pardon from a prison work camp and heads out after the men who framed him. The film is set at a stormy night in town when Hamilton takes his revenge.

Film historian Howard Hughes noted that the film is a loose remake of Salvatore Rosso's A Stranger in Paso Bravo (1968), featuring many of the same plot points and character names. The film was shot in late 1969 in Italy, and following its release there on February 5, 1970, it was released in West Germany and France. It did not receive a theatrical release in either the United Kingdom or the United States.

Plot
Gary Hamilton, a former officer of the army, is in prison sentenced to forced labor, for an attempted robbery. In reality it was a friend of his, Acombar, who committed the crime and left Hamilton's water bottle at the scene of the crime as evidence. Ten years later, Hamilton is pardoned on the basis of his military record, leading Gary to return to his hometown, determined to take revenge on Acombar and his wife. But, on the stagecoach that takes him to town, Gary meets Dick, son of Acombar, who is unaware of their situation in the past. Gary poses as Acombar's friend and instructs him,  to tell his father of his upcoming arrival. Receiving the message, Acombar organizes the defense of the city and his mansion, to avoid at all costs that Gary manages to reach the village. Hamilton managed to avoid their ambush by using the intricate underground catacombs of the city which were an old cemetery. Hamilton also takes advantage of a tornado that greatly reduces visibility during the night, to massacre all of Acombar's men one by one. This includes a trio of his closest compatriots, who were killed in unique ways including being hung from a large bell and crushed by a falling bell.

Dick learns the truth about his father and mother, but decides to side with Acombar either way. When Hamilton reaches their mansion, he shows up with Acombar's wife. She runs off to warn her husband, but just at that moment Dick enters. Thinking its Hamilton, Acombar turns and accidentally shoots and kills Dick. Acombar accuses his wife of death and kills her. Left alone, he looks for Hamilton in the mansion and, finds him surrounded by mirrors which hides his position. During the gunfight, a fire breaks out in the mansion, while Hamilton manages to shoot and kill Acombar. His revenge completed, he leaves the city leaving all the gold accumulated by Acombar to the townsfolks to pay for the damages caused during his arrival.

Cast
Cast adapted from Filmportal.de.

Production
The story of And God Said to Cain is credited to producer Giovanni Addessi with a screenplay by Addessi and director Antonio Margheriti. Film historian Howard Hughes noted that the film's story was a remake of Salvatore Rosso's A Stranger in Paso Bravo (1968), with And God Said to Cain having the same basic structure, character names, while changing other minor plot elements.

The film was an Italian and West German co-production between Produzione D.C.7. from Rome and Peter Carsten Produktion from Munich. And God Said to Cain was shot in Italy in late 1969. The film was shot at Elios Studio for its Western stage set and at Villa Mussolini, an equestrian complex near Rome. The catacombs scenes were shot at Palazzolo in Manziana.

Releases
And God Said to Cain was released in Italy on 5 February 1970 and in West Germany as Satan der Rache on 5 February 1971.  The film was within the top ten highest grossing Westerns in Italy in 1970, with film historian Howard Hughes describing it as not in "They Call Me Trinity, Compañeros, or Adiós, Sabata league, but still a hit." The film was released outside Italy, including France but did not receive theatrical distribution in the United Kingdom or the United States.

The film was released by Market Video in the United Kingdom on VHS in 1984 as Fury at Sundown. Hughes stated that many VHS and DVD releases were released with parts of the film missing, the wrong aspect ratio or sourced from low-quality prints. Arrow Video released the film alongside Massacre Time, My Name Is Pecos and Bandidos as part of their Blu-ray box set Vengeance Trails: Four Classic Westerns on July 27, 2021.

See also
 Klaus Kinski filmography and discography
 List of Italian films of 1970

References

Sources

External links

1970 films
1970 Western (genre) films
West German films
Spaghetti Western films
Films directed by Antonio Margheriti
Films scored by Carlo Savina
Italian films about revenge
Films shot in Italy
1960s exploitation films
1960s Italian films
1970s Italian films